Tessaracoccus arenae is a Gram-positive, facultatively anaerobic, non-spore-forming and non-motile bacterium from the genus Tessaracoccus which has been isolated from sea sand.

References 

Propionibacteriales
Bacteria described in 2017